Gerbillus is a genus that contains most common and the most diverse gerbils. In 2010, after morphological and molecular studies Dipodillus was ranged as a subgenus of Gerbillus, however some taxonomic authorities continue to separate them.

Species
Genus Gerbillus
Subgenus Hendecapleura
Pleasant gerbil, Gerbillus amoenus
Brockman's gerbil, Gerbillus brockmani
Black-tufted gerbil, Gerbillus famulus
Algerian gerbil, Gerbillus garamantis
Grobben's gerbil, Gerbillus grobbeni
Pygmy gerbil, Gerbillus henleyi
Mauritanian gerbil, Gerbillus mauritaniae (sometimes considered a separate genus Monodia)
Harrison's gerbil, Gerbillus mesopotamiae
Darfur gerbil, Gerbillus muriculus
Balochistan gerbil, Gerbillus nanus
Large Aden gerbil, Gerbillus poecilops
Principal gerbil, Gerbillus principulus
Least gerbil, Gerbillus pusillus
Sand gerbil, Gerbillus syrticus
Waters's gerbil, Gerbillus watersi
Subgenus Gerbillus
Berbera gerbil, Gerbillus acticola
Agag gerbil, Gerbillus agag
Anderson's gerbil, Gerbillus andersoni
Swarthy gerbil, Gerbillus aquilus
Burton's gerbil, Gerbillus burtoni
Cheesman's gerbil, Gerbillus cheesmani
Dongola gerbil, Gerbillus dongolanus
Somalia gerbil, Gerbillus dunni
Flower's gerbil, Gerbillus floweri
Lesser Egyptian gerbil, Gerbillus gerbillus
Indian hairy-footed gerbil, Gerbillus gleadowi
Western gerbil, Gerbillus hesperinus
Hoogstraal's gerbil, Gerbillus hoogstraali
Lataste's gerbil, Gerbillus latastei
Sudan gerbil, Gerbillus nancillus
Nigerian gerbil, Gerbillus nigeriae
Occidental gerbil, Gerbillus occiduus
Pale gerbil, Gerbillus perpallidus
Cushioned gerbil, Gerbillus pulvinatus
Greater Egyptian gerbil, Gerbillus pyramidum
Rosalinda gerbil, Gerbillus rosalinda
Tarabul's gerbil, Gerbillus tarabuli

References

External links
 

 
Rodent genera
Taxa named by Anselme Gaëtan Desmarest